"My Heart Stood Still" is a 1927 popular song composed by Richard Rodgers, with lyrics by Lorenz Hart. It was written for the Charles Cochran revue One Dam' Thing after Another, which opened at the London Pavilion on May 19, 1927. The show starred Jessie Matthews, Douglas Byng, Lance Lister, and Richard Dolman, running for 237 performances.

Background
In March 1927, Rodgers and Hart had traveled to Paris from London to meet with the arranger Robert Russell Bennett, also an American, to try to persuade him to orchestrate the songs for their upcoming London revue, One Dam' Thing After Another. On their way back to Paris from a sightseeing expedition to Versailles, a truck came within a hair of demolishing the cab the two songwriters, along with their two female companions, were riding in. As the truck rattled by, one of the young women cried out in apparent fright, “Oh! My heart stood still!” Without losing a beat, Hart, apparently unaffected by what must have been a nerve jangling moment, instantly urged the unfailingly conscientious Rodgers to make a note of her exclamation as a potential song title. Hart's partner faithfully jotted it down in his address book and upon coming across the note, only after they had returned to London, proceeded to construct a melody. When Rodgers played it for Hart, the lyricist loved the tune but claimed no recollection of the precipitating incident. Still, within no time at all, he produced the lyric for the now classic song.

Rodgers and Hart later had to buy back the rights from Cochran when they wanted the song for the musical A Connecticut Yankee (1927), where it was introduced by Constance Carpenter and William Gaxton.

Notable recordings
Jessie Matthews – One Dam' Thing After Another (1927)
Hamilton Sisters and Fordyce (Three X Sisters) – (1927) HMV Recording; London,England toured England with Rodgers & Hart, Bert Ambrose, and Savoy Havana Band.
Artie Shaw and His Orchestra – Bluebird (Victor) B10125-B (1939)
Mario Lanza – Movie Hits (1953)
Chet Baker – (Chet Baker Sings) It Could Happen to You (1958)
Dave Brubeck – Jazz at the Black Hawk (1956)
Joni James – MGM X1211 Extended Play single (1956)
Ella Fitzgerald – Ella Fitzgerald Sings the Rodgers & Hart Songbook (1956)
Johnny Desmond. and Norman Leyden And His Orchestra – Once Upon A Time (1959)
Alma Cogan – With You in Mind (1961)
Barry Harris – Preminado (1961)
Frank Sinatra – The Concert Sinatra (1963); Sinatra 80th: Live in Concert (1995)
Bill Evans – Time Remembered (album) (recorded May 1963; released 1983)
Sergio Franchi recorded on his 1965 RCA Victor album tribute to The Songs of Richard Rodgers.
The Mamas & the Papas – The Mamas & the Papas (1966)
Oscar Peterson
Bing Crosby – At My Time of Life (1975)
Perry Como – for his album Perry Como Today (1987)
Shirley Horn – on her album with string orchestra You're My Thrill (2001)
Rod Stewart – included it in his album As Time Goes By (2003)

References

Songs from A Connecticut Yankee
Songs with music by Richard Rodgers
Songs with lyrics by Lorenz Hart
1927 songs
Ella Fitzgerald songs
Frank Sinatra songs